Abu-Said Islamutdinovich Eldarushev (born 17 October 2001) is a Russian football player who plays for FC Akron Tolyatti.

Club career
He made his debut in the Russian Football National League for FC Alania Vladikavkaz on 17 July 2021 in a game against FC Krasnodar-2 and scored a goal on his debut.

References

External links
 
 Profile by Russian Football National League

2001 births
Footballers from Makhachkala
Living people
Russian footballers
Association football forwards
FC Anzhi Makhachkala players
FC Akron Tolyatti players
Russian First League players
Russian Second League players